Nedu Wazobia (born Chinedu Ani Emmanuel) is a Nigerian on-air personality, broadcast journalist, TV presenter, actor, comedian and content creator. He is known for his pidgin rendition of the daily news on popular radio station Wazobia FM 94.1 Lagos.

Early life and career
Nedu was born in Kaduna, Nigeria. He studied accounting at Madonna University, Elele Okija, Anambra state. He has his NYSC in Jigawa in a radio station as an on air personality. He moved back to Abuja to work as a site manager, a period which he tagged as unfulfilled. After 2 years working as a site manager, he moved to Lagos to fulfill his life-long dream of being a broadcaster and entertainer.

Comedy
Nedu is known for his alter ego personalities of Sister Nkechi, Alhaji Musa, EndTime Landlord and Officer Jato. He has a following of over 1.3 million people on Instagram.

Personal life
Nedu married Uzoamaka Ohiri in 2013, but their marriage crashed in 2018. The estranged couple have three children together. Nedu claimed his marriage has been dissolved but his estranged wife has said otherwise and has challenged him to produce the divorce papers.

DNA controversy
Ohiri, on Friday, September 3, 2021 called out Nedu for domestic violence. She accused Nedu of battering her a few weeks after she was delivered of their child by a Cesarean section. On September 4, 2021, Nedu responded to his wife's allegations and denied physically violating his wife. Nedu would later respond to her claims saying their marriage was plagued with a lot of issues. He wrote, ‘‘Our marriage was plagued with a lot of issues. One of which was continuous infidelity from her side that led to me conducting a paternity test on our kids which led to the revelation that our first son is not my biological son even though he was born within the period during which we were married’’. To substantiate his claims, he also posted a copy of the DNA test, which was conducted by a forensic laboratory, Viaguard Accu-metrics, located in Toronto Canada. The radio personality and Instagram skit maker, said, "The continuous infidelity from her side made me conduct a paternity test on our kids which led to the revelation that our first son is not my biological son".

Although Uzoamaka had said that she did not cheat on Nedu during their brief marriage, she noted that she did not intentionally give another man's baby to her ex-husband. Uzoamaka stated that she was already pregnant for her ex before she married Nedu, albeit, unbeknownst to her. Uzoamaka claimed that shortly after her previous relationship ended, she decided to get to know Nedu, then they were married while she was pregnant, not knowing that he wasn't responsible for the pregnancy. She was visibly pregnant during the wedding, and everyone could see it. She said that it was communications issues which were solely responsible for the disruption of their marriage. She said that their marriage was plagued with domestic violence and that it was not the DNA test report that led to their eventual divorce.

Filmography 
Who Cheats More, 2017 
Isoken, 2017
Meet the In-Laws, 2017
Boss of All Bosses, 2018  
King of Boys, 2018 
Chief Daddy, 2018 
Flatmates - 2018 
Chief Daddy 2: Going for Broke

Brands and endorsements
Nedu is a brand influencer. He is a brand ambassador for popular brands like MTN, Fidelity Bank, Quickteller and Sun Lottery.

External links 
 OfficialNeduTV on YouTube

References

1982 births
Living people